November Rain is a 2014 Nepali-language romantic drama film directed by Dinesh Raut and produced by Aaryan Sigdel and Sunil Giri, and it is written by Chettan Gurung. The movie is about the love story of Aayush (Aaryan Sigdel) and Sheetal (Namrata Shrestha), but the story takes a dramatic turn when it is revealed that the heart of Aayush was illegally transferred by the doctor to Sheetal's son to allow them to survive. Dalli (Chultim Gurung) is in unrequitedly in love with Aayush. It was released in 2014 worldwide with positive reviews from critics, with praise aimed towards performances, direction, and story, but some critics criticised its runtime. Although the film had an average box-office opening, positive word of mouth from audiences helped the movie to register one of the highest collections at the Nepalese box office. The movie eventually became a huge commercial success. The film is now considered one of the best romantic movies ever made in Nepal.

Plot

Sheetal (Namrata Shrestha) was a heart patient from birth. In order to save her and keep her last wish of life, Dr. Sharma (Sheetal's Dad) played by Amitesh Shah, illegally swaps the heart of Sheetal with Aayush (Aaryan Sigdel) who was born the same day claiming Aayush dead to his real parents. However, a nurse adopts Aayush and raises him in Dharan. After the death of the nurse, Aayush finds out  that she is not his real mother and travels all way to Kathmandu to find Dr. Sharma and know the truth.

Dalli (Chulthim Dolma), the one-sided lover of Aayush, follows him to Kathmandu where she assists Aayush in helping his real parents who were living in hard times and were in debt. Helping his real parents from their financial difficulty, Aayush figures out that his life is soon going to end.

Sheetal and Aayush who had fallen for each other (unknown of their prior history)  Once Aayush find out about the truth, he ignores Sheetal in every possible way. However, Sheetal can't get rid of her feelings and later, when she figures out the actual reason Aayush was ignoring her, Aayush is already approaching towards death .

Aayush's leaves a huge pain for both Sheetal and Dalli and whenever it rains they lose themselves in the rain in memory of their beloved Aayush.

Cast

 Aryan Sigdel as Aayush
 Namrata Shrestha as Sheetal
 Chhulthim Dolma Gurung as Dalli
 Amitesh Shah as Dr. Sharma

Critical response

November Rain earned about 20 lakhs from its opening day. The gross tolled to 65 lakhs in just two days. November rain was critically acclaimed by the public. November rain received positive reviews and went on to gross more than 2 crore

References

External links 
 

2014 films
Nepalese romantic drama films
2010s Nepali-language films
Films shot in Dharan
2014 romantic drama films